Valea Luncii River may refer to:

 Valea Luncii, a tributary of the Beiușele in Bihor County, Romania
 Valea Luncii, a tributary of the Dâmbovița in Argeș County, Romania

See also 
 Valea Luncii
 Lunca River (disambiguation)
 Luncuța River (disambiguation)
 Luncavița River (disambiguation)
 Luncșoara River (disambiguation)